The Roman Catholic Diocese of Bo was created in January 2011, split off from the Archdiocese of Freetown. There are about 50,000 Roman Catholics under the jurisdiction of the diocese. Its first and present bishop is Charles Allieu Matthew Campbell.

Bishops

Bishop of Bo
Charles Allieu Matthew Campbell (15 Jan 2011 -)

See also
Immaculate Heart of Mary Cathedral, Bo

Sources
Catholic hierarchy entry on Bo diocese
Pope Benedict XVI: Apostolic Constitution Boënsis

Christian organizations established in 2011
2011 establishments in Sierra Leone
Roman Catholic dioceses in Sierra Leone